James St. Ledger (1754–1834) was Archdeacon of Cloyne from 1789 until 1810.

St. Ledger was born in Cork and educated at Trinity College, Dublin  He held incumbencies at Gortroe and Castletown.

References

Clergy from Cork (city)
Alumni of Trinity College Dublin
Archdeacons of Cloyne
1754 births
1834 deaths